Isaac Boehmer (born November 20, 2001) is a Canadian soccer player who plays as a goalkeeper for Major League Soccer team Vancouver Whitecaps FC.

Early life 
Boehmer grew up in Okanagan Falls, British Columbia, where he played youth soccer. In 2016, he went to Germany to train with FC Schalke 04. In 2018, he joined the Whitecaps FC Academy, where he played for the U-19 team.

Club career 

In 2020, Boehmer signed a homegrown contract with the Whitecaps, but he did not make an appearance with the first team in 2020 or 2021. Midway through the 2021 season, he was loaned to Pacific FC of the Canadian Premier League. Pacific needed a backup to goalkeeper Callum Irving for the remainder of the season, since Nolan Wirth departed the club. Boehmer made his professional debut for Pacific on October 30, 2021, playing the entire game in a 2-1 home loss to York United. In December 2021 Vancouver announced that Boehmer's contract option would not be picked up for the 2022 MLS season, but would remain in discussions with the player about a return, and then on February 8, 2022, they reversed course announcing that they had re-signed Boehmer after having dealt former starting keeper Maxime Crepeau to Los Angeles FC and loaning Evan Newton to El Paso Locomotive. The deal includes options to extend through to the end of the 2025 season.

References

External links
 

Living people
2001 births
Canadian soccer players
Association football goalkeepers
Vancouver Whitecaps FC players
Pacific FC players
Canadian Premier League players
Homegrown Players (MLS)
Whitecaps FC 2 players
MLS Next Pro players
Major League Soccer players